Mediaset Premium was an Italian pay TV provider owned by Mediaset. Until closure in 2019, it provided subscription TV channels and pay-per-view events (only for football matches) via the Italian digital terrestrial television network through the use of a smart card as well as video-on-demand services through its Premium Play and Premium Online streaming service.

History

Mediaset Premium was launched on January 20, 2005, initially offering only pay-per-view services for movies and sports.

In January 2008, it became a full pay-TV, launching the package "Premium Gallery", available, with a package for football matches, through monthly subscription or prepaid. Over time, new packages and new channels enrich the offered.

In 2015, the new offering provides channels of movies, TV series, sport, documentaries, cartoons and interactive services Premium Play and Premium Online. From 2016, Premium will also broadcast on satellite TV. In October 2016, Disney Junior and Disney Channel ceased broadcasting, only remaining available on Sky.

Broadcast until 2018 the UEFA Champions League exclusive in Italy on channels Premium Sports and Premium Calcio also in HD. It also owns the sports rights, in addition to the Serie A, of foreign tournaments as the Ligue 1 and the Coupe de France, the Scottish Premiership, also of the NFL of American football. There are also channels Eurosport and Eurosport 2.

On 1 June 2018, also Cartoon Network, Mediaset Premium's last kids' channel, ceased broadcasting, only remaining available on Sky Italia

In 2016 Vivendi agreed to buy 100% stake of Mediaset Premium and 3.5% stake of Mediaset by selling 3.5% stake of Vivendi's shares. However, after inspecting the financial statements as well as income forecast, Vivendi did not wish to enforce the original terms but submitting a revised offer to buy 20% stake in Mediaset Premium, as well as buying convertible bonds of Mediaset Premium. Fininvest, the majority owner of Mediaset, had chosen to start legal action to Vivendi.

The service was closed down in June 2019.

Channels
The offer is divided into packages, available in prepaid or through monthly subscriptions.

Premium Play
Premium Play is a streaming service on PC, iPad, Android, Xbox One, Xbox 360 and Samsung Smart TV, Windows for subscription customers in conjunction with the TV packages.

References

External links

Official website 

Mediaset
Television in Italy
Digital television
Pay television
Sports television in Italy
2005 establishments in Italy
Television channels and stations established in 2005
Fininvest